The 1996 Big 12 Conference women's soccer tournament was the postseason women's soccer tournament for the Big 12 Conference held from November 8 to 10, 1996. The 5-match tournament was held at the World Wide Technology Soccer Park in St. Louis, MO with a combined attendance of 240. The 6-team single-elimination tournament consisted of three rounds based on seeding from regular season conference play. The Nebraska Cornhuskers defeated the Texas A&M Aggies in the championship match to win their 1st conference tournament.

Regular Season Standings
Source:

Bracket

Awards

most valuable player
Source:
Offensive MVP – Courtney Saunders – Baylor
Defensive MVP – Tina Robinson – Texas A&M

All-Tournament team

References 

 
Big 12 Conference Women's Soccer Tournament